Daniel Ilie Bălașa (born 6 August 1981) is a Romanian footballer player who plays as a centre back for Liga IV side Vulturii Fărcășești. In his career Bălașa played for teams such as Metalul Plopeni, Zimbru Chișinău or Argeș Pitești, among others.

Honours

Zimbru Chișinău
 Moldovan National Division:
 Runner-up: 2002–03, 2005–06, 2006–07
 3rd place: 2003–04, 2011–12
 Moldovan Cup: 2002–03, 2003–04, 2006–07

References

External links
 
 
 Daniel Bălașa at frf-ajf.ro

1981 births
Living people
Sportspeople from Târgu Jiu
Romanian footballers
Association football defenders
Liga I players
Liga II players
CSO Plopeni players
FC Astra Giurgiu players
FC Brașov (1936) players
FC Argeș Pitești players
AFC Dacia Unirea Brăila players
FC U Craiova 1948 players
Moldovan Super Liga players
FC Zimbru Chișinău players
Romanian expatriate footballers
Romanian expatriate sportspeople in Moldova
Expatriate footballers in Moldova